The Europe Zone was one of the four zones within Group 3 of the regional Davis Cup competition in 2015. The zone's competition was held in round robin format in San Marino, San Marino, in July 2015. The thirteen competing nations were divided into four pools of three or four teams. The winners from each pool played off to determine the two nations to be promoted to Europe/Africa Zone Group II in 2016, while the second and third placed nations played to off to determine overall placings within the group.

Participating nations

Draw

The thirteen teams were divided into four pools of three or four teams, with one seeded nation in each pool.

The winner of Pool A plays off against the winner of Pool C, and the winner of Pool B plays off against the winner of Pool D. The two winners of these play-offs are promoted to Europe/Africa Zone Group II in 2016. The second and third placed teams in each pool play off in the same pattern to determine overall rankings within the group. The fourth placed team in Pool D does not enter the play-offs.

The group was staged from the 15th to the 18th July 2015 at the Centro Tennis Cassa di Risparmio in San Marino, San Marino.

Pool A

Pool B

Pool C

Pool D

First round

Pool A

Cyprus vs. San Marino

Greece vs. San Marino

Cyprus vs. Greece

Pool B

Estonia vs. Liechtenstein

Montenegro vs. Liechtenstein

Estonia vs. Montenegro

Pool C

Macedonia vs. Armenia

Norway vs. Armenia

Macedonia vs. Norway

Pool D

Georgia vs. Albania

Malta vs. Iceland

Georgia vs. Iceland

Malta vs. Albania

Georgia vs. Malta

Albania vs. Iceland

Play-offs

Promotion

Cyprus vs. Norway

Estonia vs. Georgia

5th to 8th play-offs

Greece vs. Macedonia

Montenegro vs. Malta

9th to 12th play-offs

San Marino vs. Armenia

Liechtenstein vs. Iceland

Outcomes
The remaining eleven nations remain in Europe Zone Group III in 2016

References

2015 Davis Cup Europe/Africa Zone
Davis Cup Europe/Africa Zone